County routes in Niagara County are not signed, and there is no apparent numbering pattern. Most of the county routes act as primary roads in the less developed areas and also serve to interconnect the various villages and hamlets of Niagara County. Niagara County maintains few county routes, including only the most important connecting thoroughfares, and those are maintained by the Niagara County highway department. Most of the roads in the County, including many of the local through highways, are maintained by the towns.

Routes 1–50

Routes 50–100

Routes 100–150

Routes 902–907 

There are four county highways with designations above 900 in the county road system. None of these designations are signed as Niagara County does not sign their highways, and thus are better known by their accompanying road name. The locations of the four routes are scattered across the county.

Three of the four routes—CR 902 (Lower Mountain Road in the town of Cambria), CR 903 (Hinman Road in the town of Lockport), and CR 905 (Griswold Road in the town of Royalton)—do not overlap other routes. All four highways were assigned by 1996 and are marked on New York State Department of Transportation digital raster quadrangles.

CR 907 is the highest three-digit county route in terms of designation in the state of New York. Overall, it is the second-highest numbered county route in the state; only CR 1345 in the Saratoga County town of Mechanicville has a higher designation.

See also 

County routes in New York
Highways in Niagara County, New York

References

External links 
Niagara County Highways - Empire State Roads.com